Ryan Todd Tverberg is a Canadian professional ice hockey center for the Toronto Marlies in the American Hockey League (AHL) as a prospect to the Toronto Maple Leafs of the National Hockey League (NHL). He was named to the All-American team while playing with the University of Connecticut in 2022.

Playing career
Tverberg played Junior A hockey for the Toronto Jr. Canadiens. After going scoreless in 14 games in his first season, Tverberg had a tremendous season in 2020, finishing third on the team in scoring. After leading the Canadiens with 4 goals in their short playoff run, he was selected by the Toronto Maple Leafs in the 7th round of the NHL Draft.

Despite the uncertainty caused by the COVID-19 pandemic, Tverberg began attending the University of Connecticut that fall. When the NCAA season finally began, he served as a depth player for the Huskies. He appeared in 14 of 23 games for UConn as a freshman, recording 7 points. By the start of his second season, the Huskies were back to playing a full schedule of games and Tverberg took full advantage. Now a full-time participant, he led the club with 14 goals and helped UConn reach the Hockey East Championship Game for the first time in program history. For his strong performance as the offensive leader of a surprising Huskies team, Tverberg was named to the East All-American second team.

Following his junior season with Huskies in 2022–23, Tverberg concluded his collegiate career by signing a three-year, entry-level contract to begin in the 2023–24 season with the Toronto Maple Leafs on March 15, 2023. He was immediately signed to a professional tryout contract to join the Maple Leafs' AHL affiliate, the Toronto Marlies, for the remainder of the season.

Career statistics

Awards and honours

References

External links

2002 births
AHCA Division I men's ice hockey All-Americans
Canadian ice hockey centres
Ice hockey people from Ontario
Living people
People from Richmond Hill, Ontario
Toronto Maple Leafs draft picks
Toronto Marlies players
UConn Huskies men's ice hockey players